Torrone Nurzia called also Torrone tenero al cioccolato aquilano is a type of nougat from Abruzzo, Italy.

Born from the intuition of the pastry chef Ulisse Nurzia and produced in Aquila since the 19th century, it is considered an Italian excellence and it is listed as a traditional Italian food product (P.A.T.) by the Ministry of Agricultural, Food and Forestry Policies.

See also
 Cuisine of Abruzzo

References

Cuisine of Abruzzo
Italian cuisine